Lanthanum aluminate is an inorganic compound with the formula LaAlO3, often abbreviated as LAO. It is an optically transparent ceramic oxide with a distorted perovskite structure.

Properties
Crystalline LaAlO3 has a relatively high relative dielectric constant of ~25. LAO's crystal structure is a rhombohedral distorted perovskite with a pseudocubic lattice parameter of 3.787 angstroms at room temperature (although one source claims the lattice parameter is 3.82). Polished single crystal LAO surfaces show twin defects visible to the naked eye.

Uses

Epitaxial thin films
Epitaxially grown thin films of LAO can serve various purposes for correlated electrons heterostructures and devices. LAO is sometimes used as an epitaxial insulator between two conductive layers. Epitaxial LAO films can be grown by several methods, most commonly by pulsed laser deposition (PLD) and molecular beam epitaxy (MBE).

LAO-STO interfaces

The most important and common use for epitaxial LAO is at the lanthanum aluminate-strontium titanate interface. In 2004, it was discovered that when 4 or more unit cells of LAO are epitaxially grown on strontium titanate (SrTiO3, STO), a conductive 2-dimensional layer is formed at their interface. Individually, LaAlO3 and SrTiO3 are non-magnetic insulators, yet LaAlO3/SrTiO3 interfaces exhibit electrical conductivity, superconductivity,
ferromagnetism, large negative in-plane magnetoresistance, and giant persistent photoconductivity.  The study of how these properties emerge at the LaAlO3/SrTiO3 interface is a growing area of research in condensed matter physics.

Substrates
Single crystals of lanthanum aluminate are commercially available as a substrate for the epitaxial growth of perovskites, and particularly for cuprate superconductors.

Non-epitaxial thin films
Thin films of lanthanum aluminate were considered as candidate materials for high-k dielectrics in the early-mid 2000s. Despite their attractive relative dielectric constant of ~25, they were not stable enough in contact with silicon at the relevant temperatures (~1000 °C).

See also
 Lanthanum aluminate-strontium titanate interface
 High-k dielectrics
 LSAT (oxide)
 Perovskite structure

References

Lanthanum compounds
Aluminates
Inorganic compounds
Perovskites